Alamgir Kabir (26 December 1938 – 20 January 1989) was a Bangladeshi film director and cultural activist. Three of his feature films are featured in the "Top 10 Bangladeshi Films" list by British Film Institute.

Early life and education
Kabir was born on 26 December 1938 in Rangamati.  His parents originally hailed from Banaripara Upazila of Barisal. He completed the matriculation in 1952 from Dhaka Collegiate School and the intermediate in 1954 from Dhaka College. After completion of bachelors from the Dhaka University in physics, he went to England to study electrical engineering at Oxford University at the age of 22.

Career
During his stay in Oxford University he watched The Seventh Seal by Ingmar Bergman several times and became attracted to filmmaking. He attended the British Film Institute to complete a number of courses on the history of the film industry, film direction and aesthetics.

He also got involved with the Communist Party of England and became a reporter of the Communist Party newspaper, the Daily Worker. In the early 60s, Alamgir went for guerrilla warfare training in Cuba. As a reporter of the communist daily, he took interview of Cuban President Fidel Castro. He also took part in the wars of liberation of Palestine and Algeria. Alamgir was the founder of organisations such as East Pakistan House and East Bengal Liberation Front at London and was active in the campaign against racial discrimination.

In 1966, Alamgir came back to Dhaka. The Ayub government imprisoned him for his involvement with the leftist movement. Later, he started his professional life as a journalist. With the start of the war of independence in 1971, he joined the Swadhin Bangla Betar Kendra as the chief of its English section. He also worked as the chief reporter of the Bangladesh government in exile. This period also marks the start of his directorial life with the making of documentaries.

After the war of independence, he started making feature films. During 1981-82 Alamgir was the coordinator of the Film Appreciation Courses organized by the Film Institute, Government of Bangladesh.

Alamgir drowned on 20 January 1989 in the Jamuna River at Nagarbari ferrighat when returning from Bogra after attending a film seminar.

Filmography

Feature films
 Dhire Bohe Meghna(1973)
 Surjo Konna (Daughter of The Sun), 1975
 Simana Periye (Across The Fringe), 1977
 Rupali Saikate (The Loner), 1979
 Mohona (The Mouth of a River), 1982
 Mahanayak (The Great Hero), 1985
 Parinita (The Wedded), 1984

Short films
 Liberation Fighter
 Pogrom in Bangladesh
 Culture in Bangladesh
 Sufia, Amulya Dhan (The Invaluable)
 Bhor Halo Dor Kholo (Open the Door now at the Dawn)
 Amra Dujan (The Two of Us)
 Ek Sagar Rakter Binimoye (At the Cost of a Sea of Blood)
 Manikanchan (The Diamond)
 Chorasrot (The Unseen Trend)

Awards
 National Film Award for best Dialogue - 1977
 Cine Journalists Award
 Zahir Raihan Film Award of Uttaran
 Syed Mohammad Parvez Award
 Independence Day Award (2010)

Personal life
Kabir married Manjura Begum in 1968. After separating from her, he married actress Jayasree Kabir in 1975. He had two daughters, Elora and Ajanta, and a son Lenin Saurav Kabir.

Publications

 Cinema in Pakistan (1969)
 Started his publication house "Vintage Publication" (1978)
 Film in Bangladesh (1979)
 Mohona: Chittranatya and This was Redio Bangladesh 1971 (1984)

References

External links
 

1938 births
1989 deaths
People from Rangamati District
People from Barisal District
Dhaka College alumni
University of Dhaka alumni
Bangladeshi film directors
Recipients of the Independence Day Award
Best Screenplay National Film Award (Bangladesh) winners
20th-century Bengalis
20th-century screenwriters